Vettath J Mathai (25 February 1901 – 5 August 1954) also known as "The Lion of Cochin" was a lawyer, banker, politician and plantation owner. 

He is best known for being the first Indian to defeat a European in a democratic election in Indian history. Mathai was a MLA in the Kochi Legislative Council from 1938 to 1945 as representative of the Planters constituency.

Early life 
Mathai was born to a Malayalee Syrian Christian family in Mulanthuruthy village within the princely state of Cochin during the height of British India.

Being one of 5 sons, his father obtained a loan from an acquaintance to have Mathai and his brothers educated.

With these funds, Mathai took his graduate and law degrees from Madras.

Political career 
As a lawyer, he was a firebrand often being critical of British rule.

It is said that EMS Nampoothiripad, Kerala's first Chief Minister, would walk 5–8 km just to hear Mathai speak.

In the 1930s, only those who held 300 acres of land or more were eligible to vote in Cochin state.

In the 1937 election, Mathai ran against H.J. Valmesly to win in the planter's constituency by just one vote. As a result, he became the first Indian to defeat a European in an election to any legislative body.

Some of his legislative work included the protection 4,500 temples and ensured funds are allotted for this purpose from the Cochin State.

Key political positions 
He sponsored or supported a number of bills and cut motions to:

 Introduce mid-wives to villages and prevent the taking of payments for services from the poor in hospitals
 Investigate and tackle the prevalence of malaria
 Curtail and restrict the operation of lotteries and chit funds (known as kurie)
 Ease the lives of plantation works and owners through advocating the easing of licensing; improving roads, canals and irrigation; prohibiting the importation of Burmese rubber
 Stymie efforts to introduce sectarian/communal quotas into government and bureaucratic positions - instead championing secularism
 Stymie efforts to introduce English into the curriculum given limited funds available

Personal life and other pursuits 
He took on a number of social justice initiatives.

Mathai sold 300 acres of land in Neliyampathy and another 50 acres in Arakunnam to help get women from backward castes or otherwise poor backgrounds married.

He was also a serial entrepreneur, being a founder of the Cochin Commercial Bank, bolstering the fledgling rubber cultivation industry in Kerala by importing seeds and planting 110 acres of the trees on his holdings, and bringing coal trains into Kerala from Kolkata.

He was the brother-in-law of K.E Mammen, father-in-law of Dr T. Thomas, and son-in-law of K.C Eapen (of Travancore National Bank fame).

Later life and death 
He was given an opportunity to procure cheap land in Dibrugarh district of Assam, where he was ostensibly running a sugarcane plantation.

He died in Assam on 5 August 1954.

Legacy 
In 2010, Kerala Legislative Assembly Speaker K. Radhakrishnan unveiled his portrait at the Council Hall of the Ernakulam Law College.

In 2010, the Kerala Postal Circle ran a special cover to commemorate him.

In 2015, a road in Cochin was named after him.

References

20th-century Indian politicians
Indian independence activists from Kerala
Malayali politicians
People from Ernakulam district
1901 births
1954 deaths